Auckland Cup Week is one of New Zealand's major annual thoroughbred racing carnivals and is the country's richest offering stakes in excess of NZ$2.2 million.  Held in Auckland in early March, the carnival comprises two days of racing and entertainment at Ellerslie Racecourse - Vodafone Derby Day and Barfoot & Thompson Auckland Cup Day.

The carnival was first run in 2006.

Auckland Cup Week's feature races are:

Vodafone Derby Day (the first Saturday of the carnival):

 Group 1 $1,000,000 Vodafone New Zealand Derby for 3 year old thoroughbreds
 Group III $100,000 Haunui Farm Kings Plate
 Group III $70,000 McKee Family Sunline Vase
 Listed $60,000 Mufhasa FastTrack Stakes

Barfoot & Thompson Auckland Cup Day (second Saturday of the carnival):

 Group I $500,000 Barfoot & Thompson Auckland Cup
 Group I $200,000 Bonecrusher New Zealand Stakes
 Group I $200,000 Sistema Stakes (1200m)

In addition, Auckland Cup Week plays host to additional off-track entertainment including New Zealand's national fashions in the field final, The Ned Prix de Fashion, which will see its winner take home not only the national title, but a trip to Australia to compete in Victoria Racing Club's MYER Fashions on the Field competition as part of the Melbourne Cup Carnival.

The dates for Auckland Cup Week 2021 are Saturday 6 March (Vodafone Derby Day) and Saturday 13 March (Barfoot & Thompson Auckland Cup Day).

See also

 Thoroughbred racing in New Zealand

References

Horse racing in New Zealand
Horse racing meetings
Events in Auckland